"Waste It on Me" is a song by American musician and DJ Steve Aoki featuring South Korean boy band BTS, released on October 25, 2018. It follows Aoki and BTS' collaborations on the remix of "Mic Drop" and "The Truth Untold". The song features on his fifth studio album Neon Future III, released on November 9, 2018.

In December 2018, it was announced a Slushii remix and a Cheat Codes remix would be released in the same month.

Composition
Billboard stated that the song is an "ambient EDM track" with lyrics in English, while EDM.com felt the track was "vaguely future bass-reminiscent". Kyle Shokeye of Complex wrote that because it is BTS's first fully English-language song, it "deviates from their usual formula to create songs".

It was composed by Jeff Halavacs, Ryan Ogren, Michael Gazzo, Nate Cyphert, Sean Foreman, and RM, featuring the vocals of RM and Jungkook. The song has a moderate tempo and is 96BPM. It is in E Minor with the vocals ranging from D4-B5.

Promotion
Along with Aoki announcing the track on Twitter, he stated that fans could tweet the hashtag "#WasteItOnMe" to unlock a 40-second preview. Madonna shared a Michael Jackson tribute video featuring “Waste It on Me” on November 29, 2018.

Accolades

Music video
The music video was directed by Joe Hahn of Linkin Park and released on November 19, 2018. Compared to the music video of the OneRepublic song "Wherever I Go", which was directed by Joseph Kahn, but set in a nightclub, it features an all Asian-American cast which includes Ken Jeong, Jamie Chung, Ross Butler, Devon Aoki and Ben Baller. Cameos include Leonardo Nam, Vincent Rodriguez III, Jimmy O. Yang, Jessica Lu, Jared Eng, and Tiffany Ma.

Charts

Weekly charts

Year-end charts

Certifications

Release history

See also
 List of number-one songs of 2018 (Malaysia)

References

2018 singles
2018 songs
BTS songs
Number-one singles in Malaysia
Steve Aoki songs
Songs written by Steve Aoki
Songs written by Ryan Ogren
Songs written by Sean Foreman
Future bass songs